Blind Pig Records is an American blues independent record label.

Blind Pig was formed in 1977 in Ann Arbor, Michigan, by Jerry Del Giudice, owner of the Blind Pig Cafe, and his friend Edward Chmelewski. The label is now based in San Francisco. In the late 2000s the label started a reissue vinyl series, featuring reissues from its back catalog on 180-gram high quality vinyl.

As of 2015, Blind Pig's catalogue is owned by The Orchard, a division of Sony Music.

In 2017, a double compilation album, Blind Pig Records 40th Anniversary Collection, was released featuring tracks by many artists who recorded for the label over the years.

Roster

 Altered Five Blues Band
 Arthur Adams
 Luther Allison
 Reneé Austin
 Big James and the Chicago Playboys
 Carey Bell
 Elvin Bishop
 Nappy Brown
 Savoy Brown
 Norton Buffalo
 Eddie C. Campbell
 Chubby Carrier
 Tommy Castro
 Popa Chubby
 Joanna Connor
 James Cotton
 Albert Cummings
 Debbie Davies
 Damon Fowler
 The Gospel Hummingbirds
 Buddy Guy
 Peter Harper
 Shawn Holt & the Teardrops
 Big Walter Horton
 JW-Jones
 Smokin' Joe Kubek feat. Bnois King

 Frankie Lee
 Little Mike and the Tornadoes
 Hamilton Loomis
 Magic Slim
 Bob Margolin
 John Mooney
 Big Bill Morganfield
 Charlie Musselwhite
 Kenny Neal
 John Németh
 Johnny Nicholas
 Pinetop Perkins
 Snooky Pryor
 Robin Rogers
 Roy Rogers
 The Rounders
 E.C. Scott
 Southern Hospitality
 Jeremy Spencer
 Studebaker John
 Muddy Waters
 Junior Wells
 Webb Wilder
 Reverend Billy C. Wirtz
 Mitch Woods & His Rocket 88s

References

American independent record labels
Blues record labels
Blind Pig Records artists
1977 establishments in Michigan
Record labels established in 1977
Music of Ann Arbor, Michigan